In Greece, ephor is a title given to the head of an archaeological ephorate, or archaeological unit. Ephors are responsible to the Ministry of Culture and Sports.

Most ephorates are responsible for a particular region of Greece. However, the Ephorate of Underwater Antiquities has jurisdiction over underwater sites across the whole of Greece, as does the Ephorate of Private Archaeological Collections, while two Ephorates of Palaeoanthropology and Speleology exist, one for northern and one for southern Greece.

History 

The title of ephor was first used in archaeological circles for Andreas Moustoxydis, who was appointed by Ioannis Kapodistrias in October 1829 as 'Director and Ephor' of the first national archaeological museum, then on the island of Aegina. In 1834, the Greek Archaeological Service was established by the Archaeological Law of 10/22 May, which also formally established the position of Ephor General of Antiquities, first held by Ludwig Ross after the abortive tenure of the architect Adolf Weissenberg. Ross had previously held the title of 'Ephor' of Antiquities of the Peloponnese, from 1833.

Until the mid-1870s, the Greek Archaeological Service consisted entirely of the Ephor General himself, sometimes supported by a personal assistant. In 1871, the privately-organised Archaeological Society of Athens, which had taken on some of the state's responsibility for excavating and managing cultural heritage, began to appoint its own travelling ephors, known as 'apostles'. The primary duties of these 'apostles' were to conduct archaeological work throughout Greece, to combat archaeological looting and the illegal trade in antiquities, and to persuade citizens to hand over antiquities, particularly those acquired illegally, to the care of the state. The first of these was Panagiotis Stamatakis, whose work formed the basis for several public archaeological collections throughout Greece; he was followed in 1874 by Athanasios Dimitriadis, in 1880 by Dimitrios Philios, in 1882 by Christos Tsountas, in 1884 by Vasilios Leonardos, in 1891 by Andreas Skias and in 1894 by Konstantinos Kourouniotis. From the 1870s, the Archaeological Service began to employ its own ephors, expanding continuously until the early 1910s. These ephors generally had responsibility for a particular region of Greece: Stamatakis, for example, was recruited in 1875 to oversee antiquities in Central Greece.

In 1909, following the Goudi coup and the so-called 'mutiny of the superintendents' among the ephors of the Archaeological Service, the Ephor General Panagiotis Kavvadias was removed from office, and the post of Ephor General abolished. The title was briefly reintroduced in the 1960s, and occasionally used by Spyridon Marinatos during the Regime of the Colonels, then abolished again in 1982.Though the titles of ephor and ephorate remain for the regional units, the professional head of the Greek Archaeological Service is typically referred to as the 'director-general' or 'General Inspector' of Antiquities.

Reorganisation of 2014 

Before 2014, the archaeological ephorates of Greece were divided both by geographical region and the historical periods of the remains for which they were responsible. They were organised as follows:

 Thirty-nine Ephorates of Prehistoric and Classical Antiquities.
 Twenty-eight Ephorates of Byzantine Antiquities.
 Two Ephorates of Palaeoanthropology and Speleology.
 The Ephorate of Underwater Antiquities.
 The Ephorate of Antiquity Dealers and Private Archaeological Collections.

In 2014, under Presidential Decree no. 104, the regional ephorates were amalgamated into a single ephorate for each regional unit, covering all chronological periods.

List of Ephors General of Antiquities

First period (1833-1909)

|}

Revival of the General Ephorate (1961-1981) 
After the abolition of the rank of Ephor General in 1909, it was revived by the law 4177/1961 in 1961. Three positions at the same rank were created simultaneously.

|}

Under the Regime of the Colonels, Spyridon Marinatos was appointed as head of the Greek archaeological service, and sometimes used the title of Ephor General:

|}

The rank of Ephor General was formally abolished once again by the law 1232/1982 in 1982.

Current ephorates 

As of 2022, the regional ephorates of the Greek Archaeological Service are as follows:

 Ephorate of Antiquities of Achaia
 Ephorate of Antiquities of Aetolia-Acarnania and Lefkada
 Ephorate of Antiquities of Argolis
 Ephorate of Antiquities of Arcadia
 Ephorate of Antiquities of Arta
 Ephorate of Antiquities of Athens
 Ephorate of Antiquities of Boeotia
 Ephorate of Antiquities of Cephalonia
 Ephorate of Antiquities of Chalkidiki and Mount Athos
 Ephorate of Antiquities of Chania
 Ephorate of Antiquities of Chios
 Ephorate of Antiquities of Kilkis
 Ephorate of Antiquities of Corfu
 Ephorate of Antiquities of Corinth
 Ephorate of Antiquities of the Cyclades
 Ephorate of Antiquities of the Dodecanese
 Ephorate of Antiquities of Drama
 Ephorate of Antiquities of Eastern Attica
 Ephorate of Antiquities of Euboea
 Ephorate of Antiquities of Evros
 Ephorate of Antiquities of Florina
 Ephorate of Antiquities of Grevena
 Ephorate of Antiquities of Imathia
 Ephorate of Antiquities of Heraklion
 Ephorate of Antiquities of Ilion
 Ephorate of Antiquities of Ioannina
 Ephorate of Antiquities of Karditsa
 Ephorate of Antiquities of Kastoria
 Ephorate of Antiquities of Kavala-Thasos
 Ephorate of Antiquities of Kozani
 Ephorate of Antiquities of Laconia
 Ephorate of Antiquities of Larissa
 Ephorate of Antiquities of Lasithi
 Ephorate of Antiquities of Lesbos
 Ephorate of Antiquities of Magnesia
 Ephorate of Antiquities of Messenia
 Ephorate of Antiquities of Pella
 Ephorate of Antiquities of Phocis
 Ephorate of Antiquities of Phthiotis and Evrytania
 Ephorate of Antiquities of Pieria
 Ephorate of Antiquities of Preveza
 Ephorate of Antiquities of Rethymno
 Ephorate of Antiquities of Rhodope
 Ephorate of Antiquities of Samos-Icaria
 Ephorate of Antiquities of Serres
 Ephorate of Antiquities of Thesprotia
 Ephorate of Antiquities of Thessaloniki City
 Ephorate of Antiquities of Thessaloniki Region
 Ephorate of Antiquities of Trikala
 Ephorate of Antiquities of Western Attica, Piraeus and the Islands.
 Ephorate of Antiquities of Xanthi
 Ephorate of Antiquities of Zakynthos

Footnotes

Explanatory notes

References

Bibliography 

 
 
 
 
 
 
 
 
 
 
 
 
 
 
 
 
 

Archaeology of Greece